Kathy Radzuweit (born March 2, 1982 in East-Berlin) is a retired German volleyball player, who was a member of the German Women's Team at the 2004 Summer Olympics in Athens, Greece. She played at the 2002 FIVB Volleyball Women's World Championship in Germany. On club level she played with Volley Cats Berlin.

She is 196 cm and played as middle attacker.

Individual awards
 2003 European Championship "Best Blocker"

References

External links
  DVV Porträt
CEV-Porträt
 Bilder
 Leverkusen who's who

1982 births
Living people
German women's volleyball players
German people of Cuban descent
Olympic volleyball players of Germany
Volleyball players at the 2004 Summer Olympics
Volleyball players from Berlin